is the eighth studio album by Japanese singer/songwriter Chisato Moritaka, released on May 10, 1993. It was Moritaka's final studio release under Warner Music Japan. The album's title signifies the seventh anniversary of Moritaka's debut. A limited edition release included a 32-page photo book.

The album reached No. 3 on Oricon's albums chart and sold over 421,000 copies. It was also certified Platinum by the RIAJ.

Track listing

Personnel 
 Chisato Moritaka – vocals, drums, piano, rhythm guitar, alto recorder
 Yuichi Takahashi – guitar, bass, synthesizer, backing vocals (all tracks except where indicated)
 Hideo Saitō – guitar, bass, organ, synthesizer, tambourine (4, 7, 10, 11, 13, 14)
 Eiji Ogata – guitar (9)
 Jun Takahashi – acoustic guitar (11)
 Shin Hashimoto – piano (9)
 Yukio Seto – bass (all tracks except where indicated), guitar, (3, 12)

Charts

Certification

References

External links 
  (Chisato Moritaka)
  (Up-Front Works)
 
 

1993 albums
Chisato Moritaka albums
Japanese-language albums
Warner Music Japan albums